Karin Wolff (born 23 February 1959 in Darmstadt) is a German politician and former deputy minister president of Hesse.

Wolff studied history, evangelical theology and philosophy at Johannes-Gutenberg-Universität Mainz and Philipps-Universität Marburg. She finished university and worked as a teacher in Darmstadt.

In 1976 Wolff became a member of the conservative Christian Democratic Union. In 1995 she became a member of parliament in Hesse and became minister in Hesse on 7 April 1999.

Wolff has written two books on children and education. She lives in Darmstadt in an openly lesbian relationship.

Works by Wolff 
 Karin Wolff (ed.): Ohne Bildung keine Zukunft: sind unsere Bildungskonzepte noch zeitgemäß? Frankfurt am Main, 2001, 
 Karin Wolff: Klasse Schule - starke Kinder. Ideen, Projekte und Perspektiven für Hessen. Wiesbaden, 2007,

Criticism

She is a creationist. In 2006 she made the following remark in an article in the Frankfurter Allgemeine Zeitung:

("I think it makes sense to bring up multidisciplinary and interdisciplinary problems for discussion, that you do not just confront students with the theory of evolution in biology, and with the theology of creation in religious education. But that you also occasionally look whether there are differences or convergences.")

References

External links 
 Biography by Hesse parliament
 Biography by Hesse gouvernement

1959 births
Living people
20th-century German politicians
20th-century German women politicians
21st-century German politicians
21st-century German women politicians
Christian creationists
Christian Democratic Union of Germany politicians
German Christians
German schoolteachers
Lesbian politicians
LGBT legislators in Germany
LGBT Protestants
Politicians from Darmstadt
LGBT Christians